Teleiodes excentricella is a moth of the family Gelechiidae. It is found in Libya, Armenia and Turkmenistan.

The larvae forms galls on the branches of Tamarix species, including Tamarix ramosissima and Tamarix araratica.

References

Moths described in 1934
Teleiodes